John Olumba (born July 12, 1981) is an American attorney, politician and Democrat who served two terms as a member of the Michigan State House of Representatives. He represented the 3rd house district located in Wayne County, which comprises the north central and eastern portions of Detroit.  After serving on the House Judiciary, Commerce, Economic Development and Trade, Insurance, and Criminal Justice committees, Olumba served on the House Appropriations Committee as the chairman of Fiscal Oversight, and as a member on Community Health, and Corrections.

Early life, college, law school
Olumba was born in Detroit and lived mostly on its east side with his mother and four sisters.  He attended Miller Middle School, a school popularized by other well known politicians in Detroit such as Coleman Young and Erma Henderson. Olumba attended high school at (Lewis) Cass Technical High School in Detroit and is a graduate of the University of Michigan with dual concentrations in economics and political science. He earned his Juris Doctor degree from Northern Illinois University College of Law and studied at the University College of London Faculty of Laws as a supplement to the curriculum. After finishing law school in 2007, Olumba worked at a homeless mission, Shelters of Love Inc. and at Starbucks Coffee before seeking office. Following an unsuccessful first bid for the state house in 2008 and a run for the Detroit charter commission, Olumba worked as a school administrator. Olumba won on his second attempt at being a representative.

Family and personal life

John Olumba met Charsha Mauldin while in undergrad at the University of Michigan.  They were married in 2008 after she returned from Peace Corps service in West Africa.  They have had six children: Eliezra, Keziah, Azariah, Emmanuel, Jubilee, and Ephraim. He is also a preacher of the gospel.

Legislative career

Chairman of Fiscal Oversight Committee
In 2014 Olumba earned the chairmanship over the house appropriations subcommittee of fiscal oversight. Perhaps historical, this marks one of the first times where a representative not in the majority party maintained a chairmanship of a committee.

Investigations into Wayne County Executive
As a representative, Olumba's notoriety increased after formally initiating a federal investigation into the offices of Wayne County Executive Robert Ficano and reports of backlash surfaced. Olumba said he received threatening phone calls and elected officials visited him at his home uninvited in order to coerce him into retracting his investigation. Olumba said two of his Democratic colleagues handed him a retraction letter on the floor of the House of Representatives that he eventually handed over to federal authorities. Thus far, the investigation has yielded two indictments and one conviction.

Toward the end of his first term, Olumba also sought an investigation by the Michigan Attorney General into Detroit Mayor Dave Bing over money he said was misappropriated from two city departments.

State Representative: 2010–2012

In August 2010, Olumba won the state's most crowded primary with 16 people seeking office by a 2 to 1 margin over the closest competitor.  Olumba was elected in November 2010 in a landslide victory to serve in the 96th legislature of the State of Michigan. Although Olumba is a native of Detroit, Olumba's father migrated to Detroit from Africa as a student-activist during the Nigerian Civil War and, once elected, Olumba became the first Nigerian elected to a state office in Michigan history.

Olumba caused controversy within the Michigan House Democratic Caucus when he accused the caucus of allowing the Emergency Manager Law Public Act 4 to pass with immediate effect when they could have blocked its passage by engaging in a filibuster. Olumba is also known for his introduction of a series of bills he named the Detroit Reinvestment and Restructuring Omnibus designed to revitalize the city. It is the largest bill package intended for the municipality in history.

Olumba served on the House Judiciary and Commerce Committees in addition to a special subcommittee on Economic Development and Trade.

State Representative: Second Term

In his first term, Olumba represented the 5th house district which also included the cities of Highland Park and Hamtramck. Olumba was redistricted into the 3rd district and, following a contentious primary election in which Olumba defeated another incumbent, Olumba won the general with 96 percent of the vote. The 3rd district is the only entirely Detroit house district.

On February 19, 2013, Olumba began to work independently as a Democrat, citing the lack of an urban or African American agenda by the Michigan House Democrats. Olumba argued that Detroit is the highest tax entity in the state yet, there are no African Americans or Detroiters on the Tax Policy Committee and they are underrepresented on the Appropriations Committee.

Electoral history

References

External links
Website of John Olumba
Official Michigan House of Representatives Website

Members of the Michigan House of Representatives
Michigan Democrats
Living people
African-American state legislators in Michigan
Politicians from Detroit
University of Michigan College of Literature, Science, and the Arts alumni
Northern Illinois University alumni
Alumni of University College London
1981 births
Michigan Independents
21st-century American politicians
21st-century African-American politicians
20th-century African-American people